Park Hang-seo (Korean: 박항서; Hanja: 朴恒緖 ; born 1 October 1957) is a South Korean football manager and former player. He was most recently the head coach of the Vietnam national football team.

Playing career 
Park was the captain of the South Korea under-20 squad which won the 1978 AFC Youth Championship. On 8 March 1981, Park made his senior international debut against Japan, which ended in a 1–0 victory. Park performed his mandatory military service in Army FC after he joined the semi-professional club . From 1984 to 1988, Park played for Lucky-Goldstar Hwangso, and contributed to the 1985 K League title. He received the K League Best XI award in that season.

Coaching career 
After his professional retirement, Park started a coaching career at Lucky-Goldstar Hwangso in 1989. 
In November 1996, he was appointed a caretaker manager and was in charge of one match in the 1996 Korean FA Cup. From 1997 to February 2000, he was a coach of Suwon Samsung Bluewings. Park was one of the two assistant managers of Guus Hiddink at the 2002 FIFA World Cup.

Managerial career

South Korea U23 
In August 2002, Park was appointed as head coach of the South Korean side for the 2002 Asian Games by performing successfully as the senior team assistant. However, Korea Football Association (KFA) had not done any preparation for the 2002 Asian Games since there was no manager or coaching staff for two years. KFA had focused on the 2002 FIFA World Cup, which was co-hosted in South Korea, so Park had to prepare for the tournament in two months. In addition, KFA was criticized that Park worked without getting paid because they formally didn't sign with him. South Korea lost to Iran on penalties in the semi-finals, but won the bronze medal. Park was sacked after the tournament.

Career in K League 
In August 2005, Park became the inaugural manager of the newly-formed Gyeongnam FC in the K League. Gyeongnam finished fourth in the 2007 K League season, but Park left the team due to internal conflict. In December 2007, he succeeded Huh Jung-moo as the manager of Jeonnam Dragons. The team finished as the runners-up of the 2008 League Cup and sixth in the 2009 K League. He later resigned due to poor performances in the 2010 season. From 2012 to 2015, Park managed the military team Sangju Sangmu in South Korea. Under his guidance, his squad won the country's second-division league, K League Challenge, in 2013 and 2015. He left the team after his contract expired after the 2015 season. In 2017, Park was appointed manager of Changwon City, a third-division team. Changwon won the 2017 Korea National League Championship, and he was named the tournament's best manager.

Vietnam 

On 29 September 2017, Park was appointed the head coach of the Vietnam national football team. His debut match for Vietnam was a goalless draw against Afghanistan in the third round of the 2019 AFC Asian Cup qualification on 14 November 2017, which helped Vietnam qualified to the tournament after 12-years absent. Also in charge of the under-23 side, the team reached the final of the 2018 AFC U-23 Championship, which is Vietnam's first final in the official AFC competitions, but they lost 1-2 against Uzbekistan after extra time.

At the 2018 Asian Games, his side also advanced to the semi-finals and finished fourth for the first time in 56 years, with Park earning praise for his management. On 15 December 2018, the Vietnamese team under Park won the AFF Championship after defeating Malaysia, 3–2 on aggregate, in the second leg of the finals in Mỹ Đình National Stadium of Hanoi. This was Vietnam's first regional championship in ten years.

In the 2019 AFC Asian Cup, Vietnam reached the quarter-finals but lost to eventual runner-up Japan, 1–0. Vietnam also became the runner-up in the 2019 King Cup as they lost 5-4 in a penalty shootout following a 1-1 draw in the Final against Curacao. Park won the gold medal at the 2019 Southeast Asian Games, thus winning the first football title for Vietnam as a united country at the games. In the very next Southeast Asian games in 2022, he led Vietnam to defend their gold medal to win their 2nd straight title, before he resigns from the under 23/Olympic team. In 2021, for the second round of 2022 FIFA World Cup qualification, Vietnam was drawn in the same group as Thailand, Malaysia, Indonesia and the UAE. With Park as manager, the team finished as the runner-up of the group with 17 points from 8 games. Vietnam advanced to the final round of qualification for the first time ever. In the third round of the 2022 FIFA World Cup qualification, he led Vietnam got 4 points when they won 3-1 against China and drew 1-1 against Japan, which is Vietnam's best result in a FIFA World Cup qualification. He decided to leave Vietnam after his contract expires on 31 January 2023, so the 2022 AFF Championship in December is Park's last tournament as head coach of the Vietnam national football team. At this tournament, Vietnam came into the final but eventually lost to Thailand and therefore they are the runner-up.

Personal life 
Park is a devout Methodist Protestant.

During his tenure as Vietnam coach, he was nicknamed "Coach Terminator" by the Vietnamese media due to his supposed role in the resignation or sacking of more notable managers for losses against the lower-ranked Vietnam team. These managers include Guus Hiddink, Ján Kocian, Sven-Göran Eriksson, Antoine Hey, Simon McMenemy, Sirisak Yodyardthai, Alexandre Gama and Bert van Marwijk.

Managerial statistics

Honours

Player 
Hanyang University
Korean National Championship runner-up: 1980
Korean President's Cup: 1977

Lucky-Goldstar Hwangso
K League 1: 1985

South Korea U20
AFC Youth Championship: 1978

Individual
K League 1 Best XI: 1985

Manager 
Jeonnam Dragons
Korean League Cup runner-up: 2008

Sangju Sangmu
K League 2: 2013, 2015

Changwon City
Korea National League Championship: 2017

South Korea U23
Asian Games bronze medal: 2002

Vietnam U23
AFC U-23 Championship runner-up: 2018
Southeast Asian Games: 2019, 2021

Vietnam
AFF Championship: 2018. , runner-up: 2022
King's Cup runner-up: 2019

Individual
Maengho Medal: 2002
K League 2 Manager of the Year: 2013
Korea National League Championship Best Manager: 2017
Third-class Vietnamese Labor Order: 2018
Vietnamese Friendship Order: 2018
AFF Coach of the Year: 2019
Second-class Vietnamese Labor Order: 2020
Heungin Medal: 2022

References

External links 
 

1959 births
Living people
Association football midfielders
South Korean footballers
South Korean football managers
K League 1 players
FC Seoul players
FC Seoul non-playing staff
FC Seoul managers
Jeonnam Dragons managers
Gimcheon Sangmu FC managers
Sportspeople from South Gyeongsang Province
South Korea under-20 international footballers
South Korea international footballers
South Korean Methodists
South Korean expatriate football managers
Vietnam national football team managers
2019 AFC Asian Cup managers
Hanyang University alumni